Fauconneau was one of four s built for the French Navy in the late 1890s.

Design and description
They displaced  at deep load. Their original complement consisted of four officers and sixty enlisted men, but the number of enlisted men increased to 60 in 1899.

The Durandal-class ships were armed with a single  gun forward of the bridge and six  Hotchkiss guns, three on each broadside. They were fitted with two single  torpedo tubes, one between the funnels and the other on the stern. Two reload torpedoes were also carried; their air flasks, however, had to be charged before they could be used, a process that took several hours.

Construction and career
Fauconneau was ordered from Chantiers et Ateliers Augustin Normand and the ship was launched on 2 April 1900 at its shipyard in Le Havre. She began her sea trials on 5 July 1900.

During World War I, Fauconneau scuttled the French destroyer Fantassin in the Ionian Sea on 5 June 1915 after Fantassin suffered serious damage in a collision with the French destroyer .

References

Bibliography

 

Durandal-class destroyers
Ships built in France
1900 ships